Al Hilal Wau Football Club is a South Sudanese football club located in Wau, South Sudan, which currently plays in the South Sudan Football Championship. They won the 2018 South Sudan Football Championship. The 5,000-capacity Wau Stadium is their home venue.

References

Football clubs in South Sudan